Gerhard is a name of Germanic origin and may refer to:

Given name
 Gerhard (bishop of Passau) (fl. 932–946), German prelate
 Gerhard III, Count of Holstein-Rendsburg (1292–1340), German prince, regent of Denmark
 Gerhard Barkhorn (1919–1983), German World War II flying ace
 Gerhard Berger (born 1959), Austrian racing driver
 Gerhard Boldt (1918–1981), German soldier and writer
 Gerhard de Beer (born 1994), South African football player
 Gerhard Diephuis (1817–1892), Dutch jurist
 Gerhard Domagk (1895–1964), German pathologist and bacteriologist and Nobel Laureate
 Gerhard Dorn (c.1530–1584), Flemish philosopher, translator, alchemist, physician and bibliophile
 Gerhard Ertl (born 1936), German physicist and Nobel Laureate
 Gerhard Fieseler (1896–1987), German World War I flying ace
 Gerhard Flesch (1909–1948), German Nazi Gestapo and SS officer executed for war crimes
 Gerhard Gentzen (1909–1945), German mathematician and logician
 Gerhard Armauer Hansen (1841–1912), Norwegian physician who found the cause of leprosy
 Gerhard Herzberg (1904–1999), German-Canadian physicist and chemist and Nobel Laureate
 Gerhard Hochschild (1915–2010), German-American mathematician
 Gerhard Klimeck (born 1966), German-American scientist
 Gerhard Lang (1924-2016), German botanist
 Gerhard Lenski (1924–2015), American sociologist of German descent
 Gerhard Mayer (born 1980), Austrian discus thrower
 Gerhard Mitter (1935–1969), German racing driver
 Gerhard Friedrich Müller (1705–1783), German historian and ethnologist
 Gerd Müller, (born 1945), German football striker
 Gerhard Ludwig Müller (born 1947), German cardinal
 Gerhard Munthe (1849–1929), Norwegian painter and illustrator
 Gerhard Neumann (1917–1997), aircraft engine designer and executive
 Gerhard Noodt (1647–1725), Dutch jurist
 Gerhard Jan Palthe (1681–1767), Dutch painter and portraitist
 Gerhard Potma (1967–2006), Dutch competitive sailor
 Gerhard Präsent (born 1957), Austrian composer
 Gerhard Richter (born 1932), German expressionist painter
 Gerhard Ritter (1888–1967), German nationalist-conservative historian
 Gerhard Rohlfs (1892–1986), German linguist
 Gerhard von Scharnhorst (1755–1813), German general
 Gerhard Schmidhuber (1894–1945), German general during World War II
 Gerhard Schröder (born 1944), German SDP politician, Chancellor of Germany 1998-2005
 Gerhard Schröder (CDU) (1910–1989), German CDU politician, Foreign Minister and Minister of Defence
 Gerhard Schwedes (born 1938), American football player
 Gerhard von Schwerin (1899–1980), German general during World War II
 Gerhard Sommer (1921–2019), German soldier during World War II accused of war crimes
 Gerhard Sommer (pilot) (1919–1944), German World War II flying ace
 Gerhard Strindlund (1890–1957), Swedish politician
 Gerhard Tausche (born 1957), German archivist and author
 Gerhard Wack (born 1945), German politician
 Gerhard Wolf (1896–1971), German diplomat who saved many Jews from the World War II Holocaust
 Gerhard Zandberg (born 1983), South African swimmer

Surname

 Friedrich Wilhelm Eduard Gerhard (1795–1867), German archaeologist
 Johann Gerhard (1582–1637), German religious leader
 Karl Gerhard (1891–1964), Swedish revue-writer and performer
 Keegan Gerhard (born 1960), German pastry chef
 Peter Gerhard (1920–2006), American historical geographer
 Roberto Gerhard (1896–1970), Spanish Catalan composer
 Till Gerhard (born 1971), German painter
 Mark Gerhard, CEO of Jagex

Pseudonym or professional name
 Gerhard (cartoonist) (born 1959), Canadian illustrator and cartoonist

See also 
 Gerard
 Gérard
 Gerhardt
 Gerhart

German masculine given names
Dutch masculine given names
Norwegian masculine given names